M.S. Banesh is an Indian poet and novelist writing in Malayalam. He is also a documentary filmmaker and journalist. 
M.S. Banesh is an Indian poet and novelist writing in Malayalam. He is also a documentary filmmaker and journalist.

Literature

M.S. Banesh’s first collection of poems, Nenchum Virichu Thala Kunikkunnu published by DC Books in 2007 established him as a special voice in post modern Malayalam poetry. Banesh’s poetry collections include Kaathu Shikshikkane (published by DC Books in 2012), Nallayinam Pulaya Acharukal (published by DC Books in 2017), and Perakkavadi (published by DC Books in 2022). His novel, Jalabhara Dinarathrangal was published in 2022 by DC Books.

[1] His poems have been translated into English & Kannada and are included in several anthologies of Malayalam as well as Indian poetry of the post modern phase. Further, MS Banesh won Seven State Television Awards. Now he is working as Executive Editor in Keralavision News 24x7 in Cochin, Kerala. Earlier he worked as News Editor & Head of the department of Current Affairs in Jeevan TV, Senior News Producer in Kairali-People TV, and in Kalakaumudi Weekly. He was born at Kodungallur in Thrissur District in Kerala, a southern state in India. Currently he lives in Cochin. He postgraduated in Malayalam Language and Literature from Maharajas College Ernakulam.

Bibliography

• Jalabhara Dinarathrangal (Novel, Published by DC Books, 2022)
• Perakkavadi (Anthology of Poems, Published by DC Books, 2022)
• Nallayinam Pulaya Acharukal (Anthology of Poems, Published by DC Books, 2017)
• Kaathu Shikshikkane (Anthology of Poems, Published by DC Books, 2012)
• Nenjum Virichu Thala Kunikkunnu (Anthology of poems, Published DC Books, Kootayam, 2007)
• Kalahikkunnavarude Thirakkazhchakal (Anthology of Documentary Film Scripts, Published by Logos Books, 2016)
• Pranayavum Dhyanavum (translation to Malayalam-Love & Meditation by Osho Rajneesh), Fabian Books Aleppy, 1998
• Kalapathinte Utharangal (Interviews with MN Vijayan) Fabian Books, Aleppy
• Buddhijeevikalude Mounam (Translation to Malayalam-Noam Chomsky), Fabian Books, Aleppy
• Kali-The Flaming Faces (Documentary Script) Fabian Books, Aleppy
• Aracharude Jeevithathil ninnu oru divasam (Documentary Script) Fabian Books, Aleppy
• Mahaswethadevi Closeup (Documentary Script) Pappathi Pusthakangal, Thiruvananthapuram
• Muthangalyile Olivormakal (Logos Books, 2023)

Awards
(Literature)

• Ayanam- A. Ayyappan Poetry Award (for the anthology Perakkavadi in 2022)
• Jinesh Madappally Poetry Award (for the anthology Nallayinam Pulaya Acharukal 2019)

Awards
(Documentary Films)

• Kerala State Television Award for the Direction of the Documentary Garbhinikalude Ward in 2002
• Kerala State Television Award for the Direction of the Documentary Shavamuriyil Ningaleyum Kaathu in 2005
• Kerala State Television Award for the Direction of the Documentary Ulladakkangal in 2006
• Kerala State Television Award for the Direction of the Documentary "The Great People's Slum" in 2011
• Kerala State Television Award for the Direction of the Documentary The Blind Librarian in 2013
• Kerala State Television Award for the Best Article On Television in Malayalam (Manushyar Manushyare Andharakkunna Vidham) in 2013
• Kerala State Television Award for the Narration in the Documentary "Razakinte Ithihasam" in 2014
• Kerala Film Critics Award for the Direction of the Documentary Wounded By Sandal in 2003
• Vayalar Ramavarma Award for the documentary Narakathil Ninnulla Kurippukal in 2011
• National Child Development Council Media Award in 2010, for the direction of the documentary Swathanthrya Kudiyirakkal
• Lohithadas Award for the best socially committed Documentary, Maha Agnus Devi in 2012.
• Kerala Film Audience Council Award for the Documentary Words From The Crematorium in 2012.
• National Film Academy Kids TV Award for the documentary Swathanthrya Kudiyirakkal in 2011.
• Musiris Television Award for the best Documentary, Murukopasana in 2012.
• Second Best Documentary in the National Documentary Fest, Photofest India, for the Documentary Asahyan- The Vanishing Breast in 2004.
• Kodamana Narayanan Nair Memorial Award for Best Visual Media Journalist 2010
• Television Programmes promotion Councils' Best Current Affairs Documentary Award for "Dogs in Laloor in 2012
• KAZCHA Television Award by Kerala Television Viewer's Association for the Programme NETIZEN JOURNALIST, Telecasted by Jeevan TV 2012
• Bharanikkavu Shivakumar Memorial Media Award for Best Entertainment Programme, Netizen Journalist 2012
• Sharthchandran Memorial Documentary Award by Riyadh Indian Media Forum, for the Documentary 'Puzhayude' Jathakam, 2012
• The Laadli Media Documentary award by United Nation's Population First, for the Direction of the Documentary "Pennu Kettiya Veedu"

https://indiavisionmedia.com/jinesh-madappally-poetry-award-ms-presented-to-banesh/
https://countercurrents.org/2022/08/many-lives-of-creative-artists/
https://keralabookstore.com/books-by/m-s-banesh/3962/
https://www.manoramaonline.com/literature/literaryworld/2022/03/26/soman-katalur-on-drawing-illustrations-for-novel-of-ms-banesh.html
https://www.manoramaonline.com/literature/literaryworld/2021/10/12/poet-ms-banesh-withdraws-his-poem-published-in-2000.html
https://dcbookstore.com/authors/m.-s.-banesh
https://dcbookstore.com/books/jalabharadinarathrangal
https://keralaliteraturefestival.com/speakers_more.aspx?id=MTA5NQ==
https://www.pusthakakada.com/product/kalahikkunnavarute-thirakkaazhchakal-logo74/
https://www.mathrubhumi.com/literature/columns/mashipacha-sajay-kv-casteism-in-malayalam-poetry-m-govindan-s-joseph-ms-banesh-1.6073399
https://malayalam.oneindia.com/news/kerala/poet-ms-banesh-insults-a-poem-that-insults-trangenders-which-wrote-21-years-back-309364.html
https://www.twentyfournews.com/2021/09/22/ms-banesh-withdraw-poem.html
https://www.samakalikamalayalam.com/malayalam-vaarika/poetry/2020/dec/20/poem-written-by-ms-banesh-108552.html
http://opac.cusat.ac.in/cgi-bin/koha/opac-search.pl?q=au:Banesh,M%20S%20
https://www.newindianexpress.com/entertainment/2011/oct/22/the-love-for-documentary-films-302742.html
http://mgucat.mgu.ac.in/cgi-bin/koha/opac-detail.pl?biblionumber=62181
https://timesofindia.indiatimes.com/city/kochi/kerala-writers-to-participate-in-pilf/articleshow/88641219.cms
https://old.harithakam.com/profile.php?id=120
https://www.deepika.com/News_latest.aspx?catcode=latest&newscode=411329
https://imphalreviews.in/cinema-transports-me-to-my-childhood-to-feel-the-warmth-of-a-thick-finger-in-my-palm/
https://athmaonline.in/dr-roshni-swapna-kavithayude-kappal-2/
http://mediaonesite.vocalwire.com/amp/literature/insult-to-transgenders-poet-ms-banesh-withdraws-the-poem-he-wrote-21-years-ago-152631
https://nastiknation.org/product/%E0%B4%9C%E0%B4%B2%E0%B4%AD%E0%B4%B0%E0%B4%A6%E0%B4%BF%E0%B4%A8%E0%B4%B0%E0%B4%BE%E0%B4%A4%E0%B5%8D%E0%B4%B0%E0%B4%99%E0%B5%8D%E0%B4%99%E0%B5%BE-%E0%B4%AC%E0%B4%A8%E0%B5%87%E0%B4%B7%E0%B5%8D/
https://www.dcbooks.com/ayanam-a-ayyappan-award-for-m-s-banesh.html

References

Living people
Malayalam film directors
1972 births
Film directors from Thrissur
Indian documentary film directors
21st-century Indian film directors